Albania Municipality may refer to:
Albania, La Guajira
Albania, Santander
Albania, Caquetá

Municipality name disambiguation pages